The Battle of Tecualoya was a military action of the Mexican War of Independence fought between 17–20 January 1812 in the canyons of Tecualoya, Mexico. The battle was fought between the royalist forces loyal to the Spanish crown and the Mexican rebels fighting for independence from the Spanish Empire. The Mexican insurgents were commanded by General Hermenegildo Galeana and the Spanish by Rosendo Porlier y Asteguieta. The battle resulted in a victory for Spanish loyalists.

The battle
The battle resulted in a humiliating defeat for Galeana and his army. The Mexican insurgents lost all their artillery, though they would later recover these field pieces at the Battle of Tenancingo where General José María Oviedo would be killed in action.

See also 
 Mexican War of Independence

References

Bibliography 

Tecualoya
Tecualoya
History of the State of Mexico
Tecualoya
Tecualoya
1812 in New Spain
January 1812 events